Aaron Vail (1796–1878) was an American diplomat who served as chargé d'affaires in the United Kingdom and Spain in the 1830s and 1840s.

Biography
He was born in Lorient, France, where his father, Aaron Vail (1758–1813), a prominent businessman and merchant from New York was serving as U.S. consul and commercial agent.  Vail's French mother brought the Vail family to the United States after the senior Aaron Vail's death, and they resided in Washington, D.C.

The younger Aaron Vail was educated in Washington and became a clerk in the Department of State.  In 1831 Martin Van Buren selected Vail to be the secretary of the U.S. legation in London; when Van Buren's appointment as Minister was rejected by the United States Senate, Vail acted as chargé d'affaires, from April 4, 1832, until 1836.

Vail served as a Special Diplomatic Agent to Canada in 1838.

From May 20, 1840, to  August 1, 1842, Vail served as chargé d'affaires in Spain, remaining in the post until the arrival of Washington Irving to serve as Minister.  After returning to the United States, Vail served for several years as the State Department's chief clerk, its top non-political appointment.  He later lived in New York City; while in retirement, he declined diplomatic posts offered by Franklin Pierce and James Buchanan.  He later moved to Paris, and died in Pau in 1878.

Family
Vail's brothers included: Eugene, a State Department employee; Edward, an officer in the United States Navy; and Jefferson, an officer in the United States Army.

In 1835, Vail married Emilie Salles of New York City; they were the parents of a son, Aaron Vail II, and a daughter, Emilie, who was the wife of Henry C. Bradshaw.

Notes

1796 births
1878 deaths
People from New York City
Ambassadors of the United States to the United Kingdom
Ambassadors of the United States to Spain
Ambassadors of the United States to Canada
19th-century American diplomats
Chief Clerks of the United States Department of State